Trinity Christian College is a private Christian college in Palos Heights, Illinois. It was founded in 1959 by a group of Chicago businessmen who wanted to establish a college providing students with a Christian higher education in a Reformed tradition as a college in Illinois. The college offers degrees in more than 70 programs of study.

Campus 
The Martin and Janet Ozinga Chapel, a 1200-seat facility, provides practice and rehearsal rooms for the music department, and houses the campus ministries program under the direction of the campus chaplain. The Grand Lobby has hosted a variety of events beneath its striking stained glass window, the first of a series of stained glass panels hung throughout the building designed to celebrate Trinity Christian's mission in Reformed higher education.

The Heritage Science Center is a facility, comprising 38,000-square feet (3,500 m²) of classroom and lab space for chemistry, biology, and physics programs, as well as classrooms and a lecture hall for technology and computer science studies.

The Art and Communication Center (ARCC), provides Trinity Christian students with art and design studios, a graphic design lab, student gallery, The Marg Kallemeyn (black box) Theatre for the performing arts, and the Seerveld Gallery that welcomes guest artists and student artists, alike.

New athletics fields and a new athletics complex have been in development with completion of the DeVos Athletics and Recreation Center celebrated in the fall of 2013. The facility features a state of the art lab for exercise students, a bouldering wall, and a fitness center.

Academics 
Trinity Christian College claims a cohesive approach to its core curriculum of philosophy, history, English, and theology. The traditional (not including adult learners) student body has grown to more than 1000 undergraduates taught by more than 80 instructors. Although students are drawn from predominantly Reformed and Presbyterian church backgrounds, students also come from other Christian traditions such as Baptist, Lutheran, Methodist, and Roman Catholic.

In Fall 2012, Trinity began its first two master's degree programs, in counseling psychology and special education. Both programs take about two years to complete and utilize hybrid courses that combine face-to-face classroom sessions with online learning components. The school also began a three-year speech and language pathology program, in which students take classes at Trinity for three years majoring in communication disorders. Then for two years students can attend either Saint Xavier University in Chicago, IL or Calvin College in Grand Rapids, Michigan to finish their bachelor's degree from Trinity and receive a master's degree in speech language pathology.

Accreditation and memberships 
Trinity Christian College is a member of the Council for Christian Colleges and Universities (CCCU) and the Council for Independent Colleges (CIC). The college is accredited by The Higher Learning Commission.

Adult undergraduate programs
In 1998 Trinity Christian College opened the TRACS department, now called Adult Undergraduate Programs, to serve the needs of the non-traditional student. Adults 23 years of age and older can complete their college degree through this program.

The Adult Undergraduate Programs are offered in a cohort format, so students begin the program as part of a group (20 maximum) and move through each course together. The cohort format encourages friendships and creates a supportive environment. Each course in the Adult Programs is accelerated. Courses that would normally require 16 weeks to finish are completed in five-, six- or seven-week periods. Classes will cover the necessary course material in a shorter time frame, helping students finish their degrees and/or teaching license in less than two years. To simplify the process further, courses are held on the same night of the week during the same time period (usually 6 p.m.-10 p.m.) throughout the program.

Graduate studies
In 2012 Trinity Christian College began offering two graduate level programs: a Master of Arts in Special Education and a  Master of Arts in Counseling Psychology.

The Graduate Studies Special Education program is for those who have already completed an undergraduate degree and have a valid teaching license. Students attend class just one night a week, on the same evenings throughout the entire program, for 1 ½ years. Some courses are blended with online instruction. The program is offered at our main campus in Palos Heights, Illinois.

Athletics 
The Trinity Christian athletic teams are called the Trolls. The college is a member of the National Association of Intercollegiate Athletics (NAIA), primarily competing in the Chicagoland Collegiate Athletic Conference (CCAC) since the 1987–88 academic year. They are also a member of the National Christian College Athletic Association (NCCAA), primarily competing as an independent in the North Central Region of the Division I level.
 
Trinity Christian competes in 14 intercollegiate varsity sports: Men's sports include baseball, basketball, cross country, golf, soccer, track & field and volleyball. Women's sports include basketball, cross country, golf, soccer, softball, track & field and volleyball.

Soccer
The women's soccer team collected Trinity's first national title by winning the NCCAA National Soccer Tournament in 2005, and returned to the NCCAA national finals in 2007.

References

External links 
 Official website
 Official athletics website

 
Educational institutions established in 1959
Universities and colleges affiliated with the Christian Reformed Church
Universities and colleges in Cook County, Illinois
Council for Christian Colleges and Universities
1959 establishments in Illinois
Private universities and colleges in Illinois